Ribonucleic acid (RNA) occurs in different forms within organisms and serves many different roles. Listed here are the types of RNA, grouped by role. Abbreviations for the different types of RNA are listed and explained.

By role

RNA abbreviations

See also 

 List of cis-regulatory RNA elements
 RNA: Types of RNA
 Non-coding RNA

References

External links
Rfam database — a collection of RNA families
European ribosomal RNA database

RNA
RNA
RNA